Olga Delfina Emilia Cabrera Hansen (January 13, 1935) is a distinguished lawyer from the city of Rosario, victim of Argentina's last civilian military dictatorship, human rights activist and a person who worked the most, since the legal field, for the reconstruction of what happened in the clandestine detention center and the Information Service (SI) of the police headquarters of Santa Fe, Argentina, in Rosario during that period (El Pozo de Rosario).

Description
In September 1975 a bomb exploded in her classroom. A few days before the coup, in February 1976, Hansen's house  blew up with another bomb. At the end of 1976,while she was at home with her three children and another person,Eduardo Carafa who was an engineer, and came there for legal works. the Army stopped her car while she wants to go out with her family early in the morning. They were taken in assault cars. They were left her three children in the yard. The oldest was 10 years old at that time.

At the Police Headquarters they entered through San Lorenzo Street, and the Fiat that brought it turned left, until it reached the corner of Dorrego. She was bandaged, taken to a place in the clandestine detention center of the Information Service Where she heard crafa's screamed and his torture who was released after 20 days with broken ribs and her eyes damaged by the electric prod.

Olga was questioned among others, the police inspector Rosario Agustín Feced and José Rubén Lofiego (known as the blind man), who was the one who armed the information. They put her in a hallway. She spent several days in that place, where she constantly listened to how she was tortured. A few days later, after several interrogations, they went to the basement. At that moment they released her sight. Her eyes burned, because the bandages had been made with posters that were painted with lime.

Solidarity between peers

The women who were there receive it, help it, clean it, contain it. Among others were Ana Maria Ferrari, Graciela Villarreal, Roxana Colombo and Adriana Koatz. They took Ana Ferrari every night, they put her up, a Sergeant Vergara was looking for her and they tortured her, the oppressors were particularly angry with Ferrari. Graciela Villarreal was also terribly tortured. Adriana Koatz, was a student of chemical engineering and was a member of the Peronist University Youth when she was arrested on October 21, 1976 and taken to the Information Service. From there she suffered a string of blows, tortures, vexations. She recalls that she shared captivity in the basement with Ester Fernández, Graciela Villarreal, Ana María Ferrari, Olga Cabrera Hansen, among others. Among men she remembers Pérez Risso and Piccolo. She was then referred to Villa Devoto where her father gave her the news that her sister Edith Graciela Koatz had been murdered along with her husband Palmiro Labrador Pérez.

After a massive transfer of female detainees to the prisons of Devoto and of men to Coronda, few remained in the basement of the Jefatura. They took them to the Warden. Olga is there until September 1977, without seeing the light or leaving.

The visit of the International Red Cross

It happened in February 1977. When the delegation began to ask, Olga could not contain herself. Everyone was silent but she could not and said everything: "No judge knows I'm here, and this is two blocks from the courthouse, we do not see the sun, we do not have visitors, here we just torture and kill people." Afterwards, they told him that he could have left at that moment, but for everything he had said he was going to stay two more years. So it was.

Testimony

In 2010 began in the Federal Courts, the second oral and public trial for crimes against humanity committed during the last military civic dictatorship in the area of the Great Rosary, in the case known as Diaz Bessone (ex "Causa Feced). The case "Díaz Bessone" has as imputed a soldier and five civilians, who are accused of carrying out the repression in the clandestine center of the Information section of the Police Headquarters, considered the most important that worked in the city. in the cause are the former commander of the Second Army Corps, Ramón Díaz Bessone, and former policemen Rubén Lofiego, Mario Marcote, Ramón Vergara, José Scortechini and Ricardo Chomicky, the heart of the repressive apparatus that acted under the orders of the deceased former head of the Rosario Police, Agustín Feced.

In November 2010, Olga testified in front of the Federal Oral Court: she was not another witness, but someone who embodies the very history of the cause that investigates State terrorism  in the region.

He recalled that the then chaplain of the police, Eugenio Zitelli, defended the torture in front of detainees. In general, they had all been raped, since it was a systematic practice of the detention center and he recalled that some of the compañeras who were Catholic, asked for spiritual assistance, were frightened by what the priest told them. He justified torture as something to obtain information, but the violation if it outraged him, said that it was immoral. In January 1977, the door opened and María Inés Luchetti de Bettanín arrived with a newborn baby, for whom neither I even had clothes. Among the detainees they made an improvised trousseau with pieces of their own clothes.

In addition to pointing to Feced and Lofiego, Olga remembered the presence of Ramón Rito Vergara, aka the Sergeant, in the basement of the SI. In a train to unveil the network of complicities, he mentioned the close relations between his official defender, Laura Cosidoy and Major Fernando Soria, in charge of the war council simulacra in the Second Army Corps Command.

One of the most shocking moments was when she told of a detainee, María de la Encarnación García del Villar de Tapia, who had been terribly tortured. She herself told him a dialogue between Lofiego and Feced when they threw her to the side, after the torments. "He saw commander, how women have a degree of tolerance," El Ciego told his superior.

He also remembered the Swift workers, among whom there were three pregnant women. From Luisa Marciani, she said she was 40 years old, she was full term and she felt very bad. Despite the pressure of the detainees, they delayed their attention. Gladis, the daughter of Luisa, 18, who had been tortured to the point of smashing her heels, was also detained there. "The warders come, they call her daughter and they say to her: 'Your mom died and the baby is dead too, do not even think about crying.' That was Tita's death."

In another eloquent passage of his statement, he described how repression operated on the workers. For example, a whole section of Fader workers was brought in, they were beaten terribly. Some went to Coronda and others ran, but chastened. There were combined actions with Somisa entrepreneurs. He recalled how companies changed the credentials of their workers, updated the photos, and it was those same credentials that led the task forces to kidnap them.

The witness also saw the detainees Perez Risso and Piccolo, very hurt. "Pérez Risso had a broken arm, and Piccolo had a hole in his head," he said.

Activity in the legal field

Olga Cabrera Hansen is one of the people who worked most, from the legal field, for the reconstruction of what happened in the Information Service of the Rosario police during the dictatorship, the place where the clandestine detention center was set up largest in the province of Santa Fe and where she was detained.

When she was released, in 1978, she was not paralyzed. She approached the Permanent Assembly for Human Rights and began to tie things together, relate relatives of the disappeared with former detainees, to reconstruct the courses in what she called yesterday "that sinister puzzle". Together with her colleague, Delia Rodríguez Araya, they investigated complaints and gave form to the Feced case, which began in January 1984 in the provincial courts.

Until 1979, when she started working at APDH, the agencies limited themselves to receiving requests from relatives and processing habeas corpus that always had negative results. One day, the witness was with Delia, and three young women arrived asking about their sister, María Sol Pérez Losada. "Did she suffer from the kidneys?" Olga asked. It was like that, then, she told them to go to Buenos Aires to talk to two detainees who had been with her. "With that anecdotal fact the entire chain of denunciations began," the lawyer recalled yesterday.

Documentary film

Rosario de Galtieri. The obediente city, Argentina / 1997. Documentary / Color: 38 minutes. Period in which Galtieri decided who would live, die or be tortured. Testimonies of survivors and relatives of the disappeared of Rosario and surrounding areas. TESTIMONIANS: Victorio Paulón, Aisa Nelma Drake de Jalil , Dionisio Tessan, Alberto Minella, Francisco Oyarzabal, Alicia Gutiérrez, Darwinia Galichio, Bárbara Peters Tozzi, Dolores Araya, Manuel Blando, Olga Cabrera Hansen, Roberto Rosúa, Rubén Naranjo, Marta Bertolino, Alejandra Manzur.

Tribute

In 2011 tribute was paid to lawyers, most of whom graduated from the National University of Rosario, who took up the defense of victims of the last military dictatorship  and who accompanied relatives in the search for justice.

Assef Lucia, Baldacci Orlando, Beguelin Celia, Berenstein José Eduardo, Bertinat Lindolfo, Blando Manuel, Bóccoli Adalberto, Bruera Matilde, Cabrera Hansen Olga, Coach Felix, Censi Mario, Columba Emilio, Dal Doso Mari, Diaz Araceli, Ducler Mario, Elías Jorge, Falicoff Berta, Ferrari Norberto, Figueroa Ana María, Garavelli Vildor, Kanter Frida, Monti Almicar, Monteil Leopoldo, Navarro Héctor, Palaces Ana María, Pegorano Ricardo, Rojo Mireya, Tomasevich Luis, Zamboni Horacio, Zanella Eduardo.

And Post morten to Borgonovo Oscar, Cabreriso Enrique, De la Torre Arturo, Ferreyra Artemio, Garat Eduardo, Imbern Ignacio, Hernandez Larguía Iván, Jaime Alberto, Kohen Alberto, Lescano Luis Eduardo, Paez David, Rodriguez Araya Delia, Rodriguez Araya Felipe, Shcoler Rodolfo, Sterkin Israel, Trumper Adolfo.

Distinguished Lawyer of the city of Rosario
In November 2016, on the premises of the City Council of Rosario, she was declared "Distinguished Lawyer of the city of Rosario by Olga Cabrera Hansen, in honor of her vast unwavering career and invaluable contribution in the field of law, striving for the fundamental guarantees of people in any situation and place, actively participating as an advocate for the causes of Humanity carried out in the city of Rosario and their contribution in the CONADEP in the Never More dedicated chapter to the province of Santa Fe and in particular to the city of Rosario".9 She was accompanied by her three children, Julián, Amarai and Martín Cochero.

Thanking her, after remembering her husband, a comrade in struggle who was also imprisoned and had to carry out an internal exile, and to remember the suffering her children went through, she assured that the struggle for human rights and justice is still "not finished."

Who else?

Voices that break the silence is a sculptural, graphic and audio installation that achieves the unthinkable. The piece can be seen and, fundamentally, heard, as of March 2016 in the courtyard of the Museum of Memory, in Córdoba, Argentina  corner Moreno, a place of Memory where the Second Army Corps operated in the last dictatorship.12 The lawyer Olga Cabrera Hansen, the psychologist Marta Bertolino, the worker Teresita Marciani, Susy Solanas and Estela Hernández gave their testimonies in 1984 in the trials of the military juntas. All of them were detained by the military dictatorship. Theirs are only five voices among many others, but they have the double peculiarity of expressing the harsh reality of the forced disappearance of people while it was suffered by women, while arming a referential web where the same names of victims are crossed and victimizers, beginning the clarification of the destinies of the disappeared and the responsibilities of their murderers and torturers. The crimes they narrate happened a few meters from where we heard them, almost flush with the tiles, sitting or lying on the floor, with the city and the trees around. The place is indicated in boxes that show the basement plan (called "El Pozo") of the Investigation Service (SI) of Dorrego and San Lorenzo. There and in the Mayor's office (Dorrego, Moreno, Santa Fe and San Lorenzo blocks), these witnesses, with their companions and companions in captivity, spent months in inhumane conditions of confinement. But as we listen to them, horror is giving way to admiration for its value.

References

1935 births
Argentine human rights activists
Women human rights activists
Living people